Roland Lewis (21 September 1925 – September 1999) was an English footballer who played as a forward for Port Vale in the Football League between 1951 and 1953.

Career
Lewis played for Congleton Town, before joining Port Vale in March 1950. He made his Third Division South debut for Gordon Hodgson's "Valiants" in a 2–0 defeat to Norwich City at Carrow Road on 19 August 1950. After starting the next two games he lost his position to Cliff Pinchbeck, who had failed to turn up at the start of the season. He played three further games throughout the season, but had to wait until September 1953 for his seventh and final appearance. He was released from his contract at Vale Park by manager Freddie Steele in December 1953. The club went on to win the Third Division North title and reach the FA Cup semi-finals in 1953–54.

Career statistics
Source:

References

1925 births
1999 deaths
People from Sandbach
Sportspeople from Cheshire
English footballers
Association football forwards
Congleton Town F.C. players
Port Vale F.C. players
English Football League players